The Last Amen is an album by jazz pianist John Wright which was recorded in late 1961 but not released on the New Jazz label until 1965.

Track listing 
All compositions by John Wright, except where indicated.
 "Les I Can't" – 3:39
 "Be My Love" (Nicholas Brodszky, Sammy Cahn) – 5:57
 "The Last Amen" – 2:50
 "Stella by Starlight" (Victor Young, Ned Washington) – 4:24
 "But Beautiful" (Jimmy Van Heusen, Johnny Burke) – 5:28
 "'Deed I Do" (Fred Rose, Walter Hirsch) – 4:07
 "Sheba" – 8:28
 "More Than You Know" (Vincent Youmans, Edward Eliscu, Billy Rose) – 4:16

Personnel

Performers
John Wright - piano
Gene Taylor - bass
Walter McCants - drums

Production
 Esmond Edwards – supervision
 Rudy Van Gelder – engineer

References 

1965 albums
John Wright (pianist) albums
New Jazz Records albums
Albums recorded at Van Gelder Studio
Albums produced by Esmond Edwards